This is a list of the cattle breeds considered in Japan to be wholly or partly of Japanese origin. Some may have complex or obscure histories, so inclusion here does not necessarily imply that a breed is predominantly or exclusively Japanese.

 Japanese Black
 Japanese Brown
 Japanese Polled
 Japanese Shorthorn
 Kairyo-washu (extinct)
 Kuchinoshima
 Mishima

See also 

 Wagyu

References

 
Cattle